Ingrid Gjoni (born 24 December 1981 in Tirana, Albania) is an Albanian singer and fashion model. She graduated from the Academy of Arts, studying acting. 

Born in Tirana to a family rooted in nobility, Gjoni was one of the first photomodels in Albania. She organized a couple of shows. Between 1998 and 2002 she lived and worked in Greece, partly as a fashion model. She has also worked in the United States as a model.

She was awarded the Top Radio Albania Award for 2009,

References

External links
 YouTube

1981 births
21st-century Albanian women singers
People's Artists of Albania
Living people
Musicians from Tirana